J. Thomas Kayalackakom (1884–1968) was a politician and public figure of the erstwhile Travancore-Cochin State of pre-independent India (which became part of Kerala after India's independence). He was an elected member of the Sree Moolam Popular Assembly, one of the earliest popularly elected legislatures on the Indian sub-continent.

External links 

Malayali politicians
Politicians from Thiruvananthapuram
1888 births
1972 deaths
Members of the Sree Moolam Popular Assembly